Atlanta Streetcar or Downtown Loop is a streetcar line in Atlanta, Georgia, United States. Testing on the line began in summer 2014 with passenger service beginning as scheduled on December 30, 2014.

The Downtown Loop is the Phase 1 of the Atlanta Streetcar project, which is planning to expand onto the BeltLine surrounding central Atlanta. It was planned to start service in late spring of 2014, but has been indefinitely delayed. 

The project is the first regular passenger streetcar service in Atlanta since the original Atlanta streetcars were phased out in 1949.

Operations

Route 

The route provides access to MARTA heavy rail lines at Peachtree Center. The vehicle maintenance facility is located under the I-75/I-85 overpass on Edgewood Avenue

The exact route is:

 From the King Historic Site at Jackson Street and Auburn Avenue, westbound along Auburn Avenue to Peachtree Street.
 North on Peachtree Street, stopping at Peachtree Center MARTA station, to Ellis Street.
 West on Ellis Street to Carnegie Way.
 Northwest on Carnegie Way to Andrew Young International Boulevard.
 West on Andrew Young International Blvd. to Centennial Olympic Park Drive.
 South on Centennial Olympic Park Drive to Luckie Street.
 Southeast on Luckie Street, crossing Peachtree Street to Park Place.
 South on Park Place to Edgewood Avenue.
 East on Edgewood Avenue to Jackson Street.
 North on Jackson Street to Auburn Avenue.

Rolling stock 

The Atlanta Streetcar system uses Siemens S70 light rail vehicles (LRVs). They were delivered in the first months of 2014 and are numbered 1001–1004.

History

Atlanta Streetcar, Inc. 
Atlanta Streetcar, Inc. (ASC) is a non-profit organization founded in 2003 with the mission to bring streetcars back to downtown Atlanta. ASC's board members include the leaders of Georgia Tech and Georgia State University, MARTA, Georgia World Congress Center, Buckhead Community Improvement District, Buckhead Coalition, Underground Atlanta, Central Atlanta Progress, Woodruff Arts Center, and many local corporate business leaders as well.

Peachtree Corridor Partnership 
In the summer of 2007, a new privately funded group called the Peachtree Corridor Partnership was formed, with the goal of determining how best to move forward the proposed rebuilding of Peachtree Street as a more attractive and pedestrian-friendly thoroughfare. The addition of a modern streetcar line was (and remains) one of the main components of the proposed transformation of the corridor, so many of the board members of ASC became members of the Peachtree Corridor Task Force, and the partnership eventually replaced the function of ASC as the organization advocating for a streetcar line along Peachtree Street.

In July 2009, the Atlanta city council approved funding a feasibility study to work out certain details of the proposed streetcar line in time to apply for  federal economic-stimulus funds for the construction of such a line. However, several council members later expressed doubts over whether the remainder of the funding necessary to bring the project to fruition was likely, particularly during a time of recession.

Downtown Loop route funded 
In September 2010, it was announced that Phase I of the Atlanta Streetcar Project had received $47 million in federal Transportation Investment Generating Economic Recovery (TIGER) II funding.  The funding represents 8% of the overall TIGER II allotment, and will fund the construction of the downtown loop, not the Peachtree Corridor line, which is now regarded as Phase V of the project.

In May 2011, Siemens announced that it had won the $17.2 million contract to build the four streetcars that will run on the Downtown Connector line.

In February 2012, the city announced that the budget would increase from $70 million to $90 million. The city attributed the increase to:
 about $9 million to purchase newer and more expensive streetcars that could last 20 years longer than the refurbished ones that were originally planned to be purchased
 $4 million so that the Atlanta Regional Commission's Livable Centers Initiative could provide grants for sidewalk improvements and bicycle lanes.
 Additional work by the water department to move water and sewer pipes

In March 2012, the MARTA Board of Directors formally approved the design-build contract with URS Corporation for the Atlanta Streetcar.

Construction and opening 
Groundbreaking for the project took place on February 1, 2012. At that time, the line was projected to open in May 2013, but various delays pushed the opening back, first to summer 2014 and later to December. The first two S70 streetcars were delivered in February 2014 and began test runs on the line in the spring. The initial 2.7 mile loop cost $98M which was almost $30M higher than originally projected. 

The  loop opened for service on December 30, 2014, with all rides free until January 1, 2016.

MARTA takeover 
By June 2018, MARTA agreed to take control and ownership of the streetcar; the route is planned to be integrated into a larger MARTA light rail system. Operations were placed under the control of the newly formed Office of Light Rail Operations on July 1, 2018.

Expansion 
There are plans to extend the streetcar to Bankhead MARTA Station, via Luckie Street and Donald Lee Hollowell Pkwy, and east to Piedmont Park. The City of Atlanta is applying for a TIGER 7 grant to extend the current loop east,  to Irwin St and the entrance of the BeltLine. Costs are estimated at $62.7 million.  The City of Atlanta was not successful in obtaining the TIGER 7 grant.

Future planning calls for tracks to be extended and integrated in to future BeltLine light rail operations. Tracks would be extended east and north to Ponce City Market with an opening date projected for 2027.  As of 2022, this extension has not yet been funded or designed. Engineering, cost-benefit, and competitive funding challenges continue to plague the viability of rail on the BeltLine.  Other transportation solutions are currently being studied such as bus rapid transit (BRT).

List of streetcar stations 
Counter-clockwise loop between Centennial Olympic Park and King Historic District

Criticism 
Since opening for service, the Atlanta Streetcar has been criticized by officials and residents for its short route, safety, poor management, and lower-than-expected ridership. Although boosters have claimed that up to $2.5 billion worth of new development can be attributed to the streetcar, independent analysis shows that many of those projects (totaling at least $323 million) pre-date it, and others—such as the College Football Hall of Fame—had not taken the streetcar into consideration. Regardless, the streetcar has contributed to at least some economic growth; for example, Southeast Capital Companies stated that it directly influenced their decision to build residential housing near Edgewood Avenue, and the Atlantic Seafood Market saw business rise 10% in the months following the start of service.

In September 2015, officials from the Federal Transit Administration expressed concerns with the system's lack of safety, poor management, and failure to comply with requirements for reporting accidents. Atlanta mayor Kasim Reed and MARTA CEO Keith Parker have laid out steps to address those issues.

On May 23, 2016, state officials sent a letter to Kasim Reed and MARTA CEO Keith Parker threatening to shut down the streetcar unless the city fixed numerous problems with it that had been outlined in multiple then-recent audits.

See also 
 Light rail in the United States
 Streetcars in North America
 Nine-Mile Circle streetcar line to Virginia Highland
 Timeline of mass transit in Atlanta
 MARTA

References

External links 

 
 Peachtree Corridor Partnership homepage
 Environmental Assessment for the Atlanta Streetcar, prepared by the City of Atlanta and MARTA for the US DOT
 Atlanta BeltLine, Inc., "Citywide Briefing on Transit Implementation Strategy & Transportation Investment Act Projects", Feb 17, 2011

Railway lines in Atlanta
Streetcars in Georgia (U.S. state)
Transportation in Atlanta
Railway lines opened in 2014
Electric railways in Georgia (U.S. state)
Metropolitan Atlanta Rapid Transit Authority
750 V DC railway electrification
Town tramway systems by city